is a Japanese professional golfer.

Masuda played on the Japan Golf Tour, winning twice.

Professional wins

Japan Golf Tour wins
1973 Chushikoku Open
1974 Chushikoku Open

External links

Japanese male golfers
Japan Golf Tour golfers
1937 births
Living people